Antennequesoma is a genus of tortoise mites in the family Uropodidae. There are at least two described species in Antennequesoma.

Species
These two species belong to the genus Antennequesoma:
 Antennequesoma longissima Elzinga
 Antennequesoma tenuatum Elzinga

References

Uropodidae
Articles created by Qbugbot